The 2016 New Zealand local elections were triennial local elections to select local government officials and District Health Board members. Under section 10 of the Local Electoral Act 2001, a "general election of members of every local authority or community board must be held on the second Saturday in October in every third year" from the date the Act came into effect in 2001, meaning 8 October 2016.

Electoral systems
The local elections were held using postal ballots. Most city and district councils and all but one regional council used the first-past-the-post (FPP) voting system, with the exception of the following six city and district councils that use the single transferable vote (STV) voting system:

 Dunedin City Council
 Kapiti Coast District Council
 Marlborough District Council
 Palmerston North City Council
 Porirua City Council
 Wellington City Council

The Wellington Regional Council was the sole regional council to use the STV system.

Environment Canterbury was under statutory management and no elections were held. Statutory management in Kaipara District ended and it held its first elections since 2010. All District Health Boards used the STV system.

Mayoral elections summary
Since the 2013 local elections, two new mayors have been elected. Carterton mayor Ron Mark and Palmerston North mayor Jono Naylor resigned after being elected to Parliament in the 2014 election, with John Booth elected unopposed as the new Carterton mayor and Grant Smith elected in a by-election as the new Palmerston North mayor.

Results by region

Northland
Auckland
Waikato
Bay of Plenty
Gisborne
Hawke's Bay
Taranaki
Manawatū-Whanganui
Wellington
Tasman
Nelson
Marlborough
West Coast
Canterbury
Otago
Southland

See also
Local elections in New Zealand

Footnotes

References

 
Local 2016
2016 in New Zealand
October 2016 events in New Zealand